Trushna Vishwasrao is a Shiv Sena politician from Mumbai, Maharashtra. 
In 2014, she became the first female corporator to be leader of the House in Brihanmumbai Municipal Corporation.

She had been on several committees in the municipal corporation such as Standing committee, Law Committee, Improvement Committee,  Education Committee,  Best Committee etc.

Positions held
 1992: Elected as corporator in Bombay Municipal Corporation (1st term)
 1997: Re-elected as corporator in Brihanmumbai Municipal Corporation (2nd term)
 2002: Re-elected as corporator in Brihanmumbai Municipal Corporation (3rd term)
 2002: Elected as Chairman of Market and Garden Committee
 2012: Re-elected as corporator in Brihanmumbai Municipal Corporation (4th term)
 2013: Elected as Chairman of ‘F’ South/North Ward Committee
 2014: Appointed as leader of the House in Brihanmumbai Municipal Corporation
 2017: Elected as corporator in Brihanmumbai Municipal Corporation

References

External links
 Shiv Sena official website

Living people
21st-century Indian politicians
Shiv Sena politicians
Marathi politicians
Year of birth missing (living people)